"Love Is in the Air" is a 1977 disco song by Australian singer John Paul Young. It was written by George Young (no relation) and Harry Vanda, and released as the lead single from Young's fourth studio album, Love Is in the Air (1978). The song became a worldwide hit in 1978, peaking at No. 3 on the Australian charts and No. 5 in the UK Singles Chart. In the United States, it peaked at No. 7 on the pop chart and spent two weeks at No. 1 on the Adult Contemporary chart, his only US top 40 hit. The song plays at 122 beats per minute, a typical 1970s disco rhythm. At the Australian 1978 King of Pop Awards, the song won Most Popular Australian Single. In 1992, a remix of the song was released and featured on the soundtrack to the Golden Globe-nominated film Strictly Ballroom. A new music video was also produced.

In 2017, the song was selected for preservation in the National Film and Sound Archive's Sounds of Australia collection.

Overview
John Paul Young said of the recording, "We actually did 'Love Is in the Air' because we needed something for the German market. 'Standing in the Rain' became a hit in the clubs over there and then on the charts, so we needed a follow-up. I'd been to Germany and heard the music. It was electronic mania, all clicks and electronic buzzes. So George and Harry gave it the treatment."
Young performed "Love is in the Air" live on episode 148 of Countdown on 30 April 1978.

"Love Is in the Air" was the theme song to Baz Luhrmann's 1992 debut feature film Strictly Ballroom.

Young performed the song at the Closing Ceremony of the 2000 Olympic Games in Sydney.

The song is regularly sung at football matches by supporters of Dundee United.

The song was played at the 2006 Winter Olympic Games in Torino, Italy during the opening ceremony's parade of athletes.

Martin Stevens
In Canada, Young's recording of "Love Is in the Air" performed significantly more poorly on the charts than in most other countries, due to the existence of a contemporaneous version of the song by Canadian singer Martin Stevens. Stevens had received Young's demo recording, and recorded a version of the song for his 1978 album, before Young's song was released.

Stevens' version debuted on the Canadian charts in July 1978, and had already reached #21 by September 9, the week Young's version debuted. The two versions appear to have cut into each other's chart momentum thereafter, with Stevens' version peaking at #19 a few weeks later before declining on the charts, while Young's peaked at #26 two weeks later. In the year-end RPM charts for 1978, Stevens' version ranked #137 and Young's ranked #195. Stevens' version of the song was a Juno Award nominee for Best Selling Single at the Juno Awards of 1979.

Track listings
 European 7" single (Ariola 11 705 AT)
A. "Love Is in the Air" – 3:27
B. "Won't Let This Feeling Go By" – 3:11

 Australian 7"  (Albert Productions 11710)	
A. "Love Is in the Air" – 3:27
B. "Won't Let This Feeling Go By" – 3:11	
 		 	 
 US 7" (Scotti Brothers SB 402)
A. "Love Is in the Air" – 5:16
B. "Where the Action Is" – 3:04

Charts

Weekly charts

Year-end charts

1992 (Ballroom mix)

"Love Is in the Air (Ballroom mix)" was released in August 1992 as the lead single from the Golden Globe-nominated film Strictly Ballroom soundtrack (1992). It peaked at number nine in Denmark and number 49 in the UK. Outside Europe, it reached number two in New Zealand and number three in Australia. A new music video was shot to accompany the song featuring footage from the movie.

Critical reception
Larry Flick from Billboard stated that Young "updates his '70s classic for the soundtrack to "Strictly Ballroom" with a festive '90s-minded dance beat." British magazine Music Week gave the 1992 remix three out of five in their review of the song.

Track listing
 Australian/ New Zealand CD single (658085 2)
 "Love Is in the Air" (Ballroom Mix) – 4:13
 "Scott & Fran's Paso Doble" – 3:56

 European remix single (Columbia – 658426 8)
 "Love Is in the Air" (Strictly Dance Mix) – 8:27
 "Love Is in the Air" (Strictly Dance Instrumental) – 5:00
 "Love Is in the Air" (Ballroom Mix) – 4:13

Charts

Weekly chart

Year-end charts

Certifications

Other Covers Of Love Is In The Air
Jeff Cascaro (2008)
Harisson Craig (2014)
The Overtones (2018)

See also
List of number-one adult contemporary singles of 1978 (U.S.)

References

External links
 Lyrics of this song
Martin Stevens (French language site)
 

1977 songs
1977 singles
1978 singles
1992 singles
John Paul Young songs
Songs written by Harry Vanda
Songs written by George Young (rock musician)
Song recordings produced by Harry Vanda
Song recordings produced by George Young (rock musician)
Scotti Brothers Records singles
Columbia Records singles
Albert Productions singles
Ariola Records singles
APRA Award winners
Disco songs